Žalobín is a village and municipality in Vranov nad Topľou District in the Prešov Region of eastern Slovakia.

History
In historical records the village was first mentioned in 1451.

Geography
The municipality lies at an altitude of 140 metres and covers an area of 11.877 km². It has a population of about 760 people.

External links
 
 
http://www.statistics.sk/mosmis/eng/run.html

Villages and municipalities in Vranov nad Topľou District